P. Frank Winkler, Jr. is an astronomer and noted subject-matter expert on supernova.  He received his doctorate from Harvard and is currently the Gamaliel Painter Bicentennial Professor in Physics at Middlebury College located in Middlebury, Vermont.

Dr. Winkler has calculated the distance for the brightest supernova event recorded in human history, SN 1006, as being ~7,200 light years distant.

Winkler is also the recipient of record for a Recovery Act grant for continued research regarding supernova. Frank Winkler is also a member of the International Astronomical Union.

References

American astronomers
Middlebury College faculty
Living people
Harvard University alumni
Year of birth missing (living people)